Apostolic School of Theology (AST) was a private online Apostolic Bible college based in Elk Grove, California. In  It provided undergraduate and graduate programs to members of the Apostolic Pentecostal denomination. It is now closed.

References

External links 
Apostolic School of Theology Official Website

Bible colleges
Elk Grove, California
1984 establishments in California
Educational institutions established in 1984